Huallanca (possibly from Quechua for "mountain range" and a cactus plant (Opuntia subulata)), also known as Burro (Spanish for "donkey"), is a ) high mountain in the Andes of Peru. It is the highest peak in the Huallanca mountain range. Huallanca is located in the Ancash Region, Bolognesi Province, in the districts of Aquia and Huallanca. It is situated in the northern half of the range, southeast of the Yanashallash pass and the peaks of  Tankan, Ch'uspi and Tankanqucha. Kuntur Wayi lies southwest of it. Winchus ) is the peak west of Wallanka at the Tuna Kancha valley.

References 

Mountains of Peru
Mountains of Ancash Region